The Henin–S. Williams rivalry was a tennis rivalry between Justine Henin and Serena Williams,

who met 14 times between 2001 and 2010. When Henin was an active player, their rivalry was one of the most heated and competitive on the WTA Tour; their contests were not just athletic in nature, but also personal as Henin made a controversial gesture during their 2003 French Open semifinal encounter.  Williams leads their head-to-head, 8–6.

Head-to-head

Justine Henin–Serena Williams (6–8)

Breakdown of the rivalry
All courts: Williams, 8–6
Hard courts: Williams, 4–1
Clay courts: Henin, 4–1
Grass courts: Equal, 1–1
Carpet: Williams, 2–0
Grand Slam matches: Henin, 4–3
Grand Slam finals: Williams, 1–0
Year-End Championships matches: Williams, 1–0
Year-End Championships finals: None
Fed Cup matches: None
Matches won after saving match points: Williams, 1–0
All finals: Williams, 3–2
Sets Won: Williams, 19–14
Games Won: Williams, 164–146

Performance timeline

Grand Slam tournaments 

 Bold = players met during this tournament

By Year

1998–2003

2004–2009

2010–2015

See also
List of tennis rivalries
Clijsters–Henin rivalry
Williams sisters rivalry

References

Tennis rivalries
Sports rivalries in the United States